Ustyanovo is a village in Orekhovo-Zuyevsky District of Moscow Oblast, Russia, located on the Shuvoyka River.

Municipally, the village is a part of Ilyinskoye Rural Settlement (the administrative center of which is the village of Ilyinsky Pogost). Population: 106 (1997 est.). Postal code: 142650.

The village is located in the historical area of Guslitsa.

External links
Orekhovo-Zuyevo portal. Information about Ustyanovo 
Official website of Orekhovo-Zuyevsky District, Moscow Oblast. Information about Ilyinskoye Rural Settlement 
Semeyskiye's (Old Believers from Transbaikal) website. Information about Nikolay Martyanov, Old Believers architect of the church in Ustyanovo. 
A. Pankratov (Russian Orthodox Old-Rite Church priest). Saint Nicholas Church in Ustyanovo is an example of a "museum church" from the beginning of the 20th century. 

Rural localities in Moscow Oblast
Old Believer communities in Russia